The Todd River (Arrernte: Lhere Mparntwe) is an ephemeral river in the southern Northern Territory, central Australia. The origins of the Todd River are in the MacDonnell Ranges, where it flows past the Telegraph Station, almost through the centre of Alice Springs, through Heavitree Gap at the southern end of Alice Springs and continuing on for some distance, passing through the western part of the Simpson Desert, as it becomes a tributary of the Hale River, and eventually flowing into Lake Eyre in South Australia.

The indigenous Arrernte people know this river as Lhere Mparntwe (pronounced ler-ra m-barn-twa).

The Todd is in a very arid part of Australia and has zero to very low flow during 95% of the year. When it does flow, it carries a heavy sediment load picked up from the grazing land around the Bond Springs homestead which lends its waters a milky chocolate colour and renders them completely opaque.

The Todd River's English name, and that of its tributary, the Charles River, were given by surveyor W. W. Mills, after Charles Todd, then South Australian Superintendent of Telegraphs and Postmaster General of South Australia, who was largely responsible for the construction of the Overland Telegraph Line.

Significance to Alice Springs 
 
The Todd River is integral to the city of Alice Springs, which has its central business district built on the edge of the river. A large portion of the Alice Springs municipal area is situated on a flood plain of the Todd River, created by flooding upstream of the east-west barrier created by the Heavitree Range, a local segment of the MacDonnell Ranges. The Todd runs south through this range at Heavitree Gap along with the main road and rail links connecting Alice Springs to Adelaide. Heavy flows of the Todd can cut road and rail access, and the bottle neck effect of the Gap can cause flooding in many parts of the town. There have been numerous cases of people drowning as often people camp in the riverbed and the flooding can occur very rapidly and unexpectedly from heavy rains upstream.

Heavy rainfalls in the catchment to the north of Alice Springs cause the river to start flowing through the town around 6 to 8 hours later. The river can change from its normal dry bed to a bank-to-bank flow within 15 minutes, and it is possible to follow the leading edge of the flow as it snakes through town at a walking pace.

The riverbed contains sites and trees sacred to the local Arrente people including strong associations with Yeperenye (Caterpillar) Dreaming and with certain old red-river gums in the river representing Kwekatja; pre-initiated boys following the river north.

Recreation and social events 

The Henley-on-Todd Regatta has been held in Alice Springs annually since 1961. The ironic regatta is held on the dry riverbed, and draws up to 20,000 spectators. Bottomless boats are picked up by the competitors standing within them and running down the course. The regatta carries insurance against the risk of water in the riverbed. The Henley-on-Todd Regatta has been cancelled once, in 1993, due to flooding - the river had too much water for the race.

Other events are held in the dry riverbed, including the closing ceremony for the 2006 Alice Festival. Camping in the riverbed is illegal, although this law is rarely enforced.

A flow of water in the river is quite an event for the people of Alice Springs, who flock to the causeways and the Telegraph Station to play in the fleeting waters. Although the riverbed is wide and of gentle gradient through the town the opaque waters combined with trees, waterborne and man-made hazards make playing in the flowing river dangerous.

Upstream from Alice Springs the Todd River descends quite rapidly, dropping 100 metres from Junction Waterhole to the Telegraph Station over 8 km of river length (5 km direct). This is a hilly area, and the river bed is strewn with rocks creating some lively rapids during the short-lived flood events. Many locals are wary of these waters, remembering the death of a local man in 1997 who drowned whilst riding the river on a lilo. Local paddlers have recently taken to kayaking this section of grade 2 to 3 rapids.

See also

List of rivers of Northern Territory

References

Further reading
Cultural Values Associated with Alice Springs water by Dick Kimber 
Lira imarukua lhere mparntwe : the Todd River by Dick Kimber
Ausemade, Todd River Photos, 2006-2007 - Todd River - a rare occurrence

External links
Todd River Images

Rivers of the Northern Territory
Alice Springs
Lake Eyre basin